Lauren Bruce (born 23 March 1997) is a New Zealand hammer thrower who has been selected to represent her country at the 2020 Summer Olympics.

Between 20 September 2020 and 26 March 2021 Bruce held the Oceania Record in the hammer throw with her personal best distance of 73.47m.  Bruce took the record from, and then lost the record to, fellow New Zealander Julia Ratcliffe.

References

External links
 
 
 
 

1997 births
Living people
New Zealand female hammer throwers
Olympic athletes of New Zealand
Athletes (track and field) at the 2020 Summer Olympics
Commonwealth Games competitors for New Zealand
Athletes (track and field) at the 2022 Commonwealth Games